Dayaram Jethamal Sindh Government Science College, commonly known as DJ Science College, is a public community college that is affiliated with the University of Karachi — it is located near Burns Road in Karachi, Sindh, Pakistan. It's alumni are called 'Djarians'.

Premises 

The college has following premises:
 The Main Building is divided into two main parts. One new portion has the principal's, superintendent's and clerks' offices. In this portion are the departments of Urdu and Statistics on the ground floor and the departments of Islamic Studies and Pakistan Studies on the first floor. The oldest portion of the main building has the departments of Biochemistry, Botany, English & Physics in the ground floor, department of Chemistry, Computer Science & Microbiology and some classrooms in the first floor and department of Zoology in the second floor. 
 A. Q. Block has only classrooms; they are specially for first year.

 There is another building on Muhammad bin Qasim Road, behind the main oldest building, it has the Main Library and departments of Mathematics and Geology.

 M.Sc. block is under construction. It is opposite the A. Q. Block.
 State-of-the-art gymnasium is adjacent to the A. Q. Block.

 The principal's bungalow is one of the oldest building. Nowadays, Sindh Textbook Board has occupied this building as camp office.
 Sport Complex is near the P.I.D.C roundabout and opposite the Pearl Continent Hotel. This complex is used for cricket and football.

Faculties / Departments 
The college has the following departments:
 Biochemistry
 Botany
 Chemistry
 English
 Geology
 Islamic Studies
 Mathematics
 Microbiology
 Pakistan Studies
 Physical Education and Sports
 Physics
 Sindhi
 Statistics
 Urdu
 Zoology

Admission 
The college offers the admission in Pre-Engineering and Pre-Medical for Intermediate level affiliated to the Board of Intermediate Education, Karachi (B.I.E.K) under CAP (Centralized Admission Policy).

Affiliation
For undergraduate level, the college offers a combination of any three of the following subjects (Mathematics, Physics, Chemistry, Geology, Statistics, Microbiology, Biochemistry, Botany & Zoology). The college also offers admission in three year Bachelor of Computer Science (B.C.S. Semester System) programme, affiliated to University of Karachi since 1951.

Principals

Pre-Independence
 Mullineux R. Walmsley (1887–1888)
 Moses John Jackson (1888–1907)
 H.P Ferrell (1908–1916)
 A.C. Miller (1917–1918)
 T.M. Shahani (1918–1927)
 N.B Butani (1927–1943)
 H.M Gurbaxani (1943–1944)
 J.V Lakhani (1944–1947)
 Mariwalla, Dharamdas Tekchand (1947)

Post Independence
 LA deSouza (1955–1961)
 JB Sidhwa (1961–1967)
 Iftekhar Ahmed Ansari (1967–1972)
 S. H. Zubairi (1972–1984)
 Obaidur Rehman (1984–1985)
 Abdul Samad (1985–1986)
 Naseem Sheikh (1986 Apr–Jun)
 Ziauddin Ahmed (1986 Jul–Sep)
 Anwarul Haq Hashmi (1986–1987)
 Zaheer Ahmed (1987–1988)
 Naseem Ahmed Sheikh (1988–1990)
 Sabzwari (1990) 
 M Qasim Siddiqui (1990–1991)
 Abul Wakeel Qureshi (1991)
 Aamir Ismail (1990-1991)
 M Qasim Siddiqui (1991–1993)
 Syed Kamal Uddin (1993–1995)
 Mazharul Haq (1995–1996)
 Muhammad Sharif Memon (1996 - 1997) 
 Ravi Shankar Harani (1997)  
 Asif (1997–1999)
 Ravi Shankar Harani (1999 - 2006) 
 Hakeemullah Baig Chughtai (2006 to 2009)
 Syed Rizwan Haider Taqvi (2009)
 Kamil Shere (1 March 2010 to 5 March 2012)
 Syed Afzal Hussain (5 March 2012 - 12 June 2013) 
 Muhammad Arshad (Acting) (13 June 2013 to 16 July 2013)
 Ghulam Mehdi Balouch (17 July 2013 - 31 March 2014) 
 Muhammad Arshad (Acting) (1 April 2014 to 12 August 2014)
 Allah Bux Awan (13 August 2014 to 17 October 2014)
 Muhammad Arshad (18 Oct 2014 to 20 Dec 2016)
 Shehzad Muslim Khan (acting) (21 December 2016 to 20 September 2017)
 Muhammad Saleem (21 September 2017 to 30 March 2019)
 Shehzad Muslim Khan (acting) (31 March 2019 to May 2020)
 Ghulam Mustafa Charan (May 2020 – April 2021)
 Muhammad Mehar Mangi (April 2021 - November 2022)
Rashid Mahar (November 2022 - Present)

Notable graduates 
 Syed Murad Ali Shah (Chief Minister of Sindh, Pakistan)
 Abdul Qadeer Khan (Nuclear Scientist & Head Of Pakistan Nuclear Weapons Program)
 Ashraf Habibullah (president and CEO of Computers and Structures, Inc.)
 Ziaur Rahman (former President of Bangladesh)
 Pirzada Qasim (ex-vice chancellor Karachi University, vice chancellor Ziauddin University)
 Adeebul Hasan Rizvi - founder of Sindh Institute of Urology & Transplantation (SIUT)
 Shahid Masood (journalist and TV anchor person)
 Kamran Ashraf (national hockey player)
 Shahid Ali Khan (national hockey player)
 Sohail Rana (film and TV music composer)
 Ghulam Hussain Hidayatullah (ex-Chief Minister of Sindh)
 K. M. Kundnani (Principal, D.G. National College, 1947 and founder, National College, Mumbai)
Dolarrai Mankad (a well-known Sanskrit scholar and First vice-chancellor  of Saurashtra University) 
Moiz Ullah Baig (International Scrabble player - Pakistan Scrabble Champion 2018 & World Junior Scrabble Champion 2018)
Aspy Engineer, Indian pilot
Jamshed Nusserwanjee Mehta (1st Mayor of Karachi)
Mobeen Masood, ( 1st Long Distance Motorcycle Racer)

References

External links 
 
 
 

Universities and colleges in Karachi
Educational institutions established in 1882
University of Karachi
1882 establishments in British India
Heritage sites in Karachi